Damir Musin (born October 5, 1994) is a Russian professional ice hockey defenceman. He is currently playing with Dizel Penza of the Supreme Hockey League (VHL).

Playing career
Musin made his Kontinental Hockey League debut playing with Ak Bars Kazan during the 2014–15 KHL season.

In the 2018–19 season, Musin left Kazan to split the year between HC Sochi and HC Neftekhimik Nizhnekamsk. He contributed with 7 points through 55 games before he was returned in a trade to Ak Bars Kazan, in exchange for financial compensation on May 7, 2019.

After a brief stint with Oulun Kärpät of the Liiga to end the 2021–22 season, Musin returned to the KHL in the off-season, securing a one-year contract with Admiral Vladivostok on 3 June 2022.

Awards and honours

References

External links

1994 births
Living people
Ak Bars Kazan players
Dizel Penza players
HC Neftekhimik Nizhnekamsk players
Oulun Kärpät players
Russian ice hockey defencemen
HC Sochi players
HC Spartak Moscow players
HC Vityaz players